Bjarni Eggerts Guðjónsson (born 26 February 1979) is an Icelandic former professional footballer, who was last manager of KR.

He has played in Belgium, England and Germany and has two brothers who have also played professional football, Þórður and Jóhannes. All three played together at Genk. He is also the son of former footballer and now manager Guðjón Þórðarson.

Club career
Bjarni was born in Akranes. He began his career at his hometown club ÍA, before moving to English club Newcastle United in 1997 for £500,000.  He failed to break into the first team at the club and left a year later for Belgian club Genk before returning to England in 2000 with Stoke City in a £250,000 signing joining up with his father Guðjón Þórðarson who was manager. He became a regular in the first team and made 53 appearances in the 2000–01 season however he was transfer listed at the end of the season as his father felt Bjarni was struggling to deal with being the son of the manager. No transfer away from the club was forthcoming and Bjarni stayed for the 2001–02 season and this time played 54 matches as Stoke gained promotion via the play-offs. Despite gaining promotion his father was sacked by the board. Bjarni stayed at Stoke and helped the club to avoid relegation before he joined his brother Þórður Guðjónsson at VfL Bochum on a free transfer.

He struggled to cement a place in the first team at Bochum and was loaned out to Coventry City in 2004 where he excelled under the management of Eric Black. Coventry signed him on a free later that year however he struggled for game time under new manager Peter Reid and eventually fell out of favour. He was signed on a free by Plymouth Argyle who he stayed with for two years and was a popular character, scoring once against Everton in the FA Cup, before joining ÍA again in 2006.  In his second spell at ÍA he stayed for two years, until he was sold to KR in 2008.

International career
Bjarni made his debut for Iceland as a substitute for Helgi Sigurðsson in a friendly match against Slovakia in April 1997 and has been capped 19 more times since, scoring once against Liechtenstein in a World Cup qualifier in 1997, as well as captaining his side in a 2008 fixture.

Career statistics

Club

International

Honours
ÍA
 Úrvalsdeild: 1995, 1996
 Icelandic Cup: 1996
 Icelandic League Cup: 1996

Genk
 Belgian First Division: 1998–99

Stoke City
 Football League Trophy: 2000
 Football League Second Division play-off final: 2002

References

External links

1979 births
Living people
Bjarni Gudjonsson
Bjarni Gudjonsson
Association football midfielders
Bjarni Gudjonsson
Bjarni Gudjonsson
Bjarni Gudjonsson
Newcastle United F.C. players
K.R.C. Genk players
Stoke City F.C. players
VfL Bochum players
Coventry City F.C. players
Plymouth Argyle F.C. players
Bundesliga players
English Football League players
Bjarni Gudjonsson
Bjarni Gudjonsson
Icelandic football managers
Bjarni Gudjonsson
Icelandic expatriate sportspeople in England
Expatriate footballers in England
Icelandic expatriate sportspeople in Belgium
Expatriate footballers in Belgium
Icelandic expatriate sportspeople in Germany
Expatriate footballers in Germany